Memories and Portraits is a collection of essays by Robert Louis Stevenson, first published in 1887.

Contents
I.    The Foreigner at Home
II.   Some College Memories
III.  Old Morality
IV.   A College Magazine
V.    An Old Scotch Gardener
VI.   Pastoral
VII.  The Manse
VIII. Memories of an Islet
IX.   Thomas Stevenson
X.    Talk And Talkers: First Paper
XI.   Talk And Talkers: Second Paper
XII.  The Character of Dogs
XIII. "A Penny Plain and Twopence Coloured"
XIV.  A Gossip on a Novel of Dumas's
XV.   A Gossip on Romance
XVI.  A Humble Remonstrance

External links
 

1887 non-fiction books
Books by Robert Louis Stevenson
Essay collections
Chatto & Windus books